Arkanserpeton is an extinct genus of dissorophoid temnospondyl represented by a fragmentary isolated femur and an isolated neural arch. It is not considered to be sufficiently diagnostic and was designated as a nomen dubium by Schoch & Milner (2014).

References 

Dissorophoids
Cisuralian temnospondyls of North America
Carboniferous Arkansas
Permian Arkansas
Prehistoric amphibian genera